Richard Alston (born 4 April 1965) is professor of Roman history at Royal Holloway, University of London. Alston's research is in the area of "Roman imperialism, the Roman and Byzantine city, issues of individuality in the early Roman empire, and the relationship between modern and ancient political ideologies."

Selected publications
Rome's Revolution: Death of the Republic and Birth of the Empire Alston, New York, Oxford: Oxford University Press, 2015.
Aspects of Roman History 31 BC - AD 117, London, New York: Routledge, 2014.
Ancient Slavery and Abolition: From Hobbes to Hollywood Alston, R. (ed.), Hall, E. (ed.) & McConnell, J. (ed.) 2011 Oxford University Press.
Political Culture in the Greek City after the Classical Age, Alston, R. (ed.) & van Nijf, O. (ed.) 2011 Peeters.
Reflections of Romanity: Discourses of Subjectivity in Imperial Rome, Alston, R. & Spentzou, E. 2011 The Ohio State University Press.
Reading Ancient Slavery, Alston, R. (ed.), Hall, E. (ed.) & Proffitt, L. (ed.) 2010 Duckworth.
Feeding the Ancient City, Alston, R. (ed.) & van Nijf, O. (ed.) 2008 Peeters. (The Greek City in the Post-Classical Age)
The City in Roman and Byzantine Egypt, London, New York: Routledge, 2002.
Aspects of Roman History: AD 14 - 117, Routledge, 1998.

References 

Academics of Royal Holloway, University of London
British historians
Classical scholars of the University of London
Living people
1965 births